Ecclesiastical government or ecclesiastical hierarchy may refere to:

 Theocracy, a form of religious State government
 Hierocracy (medieval), papal temporal supremacy over the State
 Ecclesiastical polity, the government of a Christian denomination
 Hierarchy of the Catholic Church
 Ecclesiastical jurisdiction, jurisdiction by church leaders over other church leaders and over the laity

See also 

 Canonical territory